Grant Shoults (born June 6, 1997) is a retired American competitive swimmer who won the gold medal in the 400 meter freestyle at the 2015 FINA World Junior Swimming Championships in Singapore. He also won the silver medal in the 200 meter freestyle. Together with his teammates, he holds the junior world record in the 4 × 200 m freestyle relay.

Shoults also participated in the 2014 Junior Pan Pacific Championships in Maui, Hawaii.

He attends Santa Margarita Catholic High School in Southern California and committed to swimming at Stanford in college in 2016.

In addition, Shoults has won several CIF titles.

References

1997 births
Living people
American male freestyle swimmers
Universiade medalists in swimming
Universiade silver medalists for the United States
Universiade bronze medalists for the United States
Medalists at the 2017 Summer Universiade
Stanford Cardinal men's swimmers
Sportspeople from Orange County, California